The Hainan gymnure (Neohylomys hainanensis) or Hainan moonrat is a species of mammal in the family Erinaceidae. Its natural habitat is subtropical or tropical dry forests. It was thought to be endemic to the island of Hainan, China where it is threatened due to habitat loss, but in 2018 was found to also occur in, and be rather common, within Northern Vietnam.

This gymnure is in the monotypic genus Neohylomys. Although previously considered part of the genus Hylomys, gene sequencing of a mitochondrial cytochrome b gene supports the idea that the species is sufficiently distantly related to comprise a genus of its own.

See also
List of endangered and protected species of China

References

Mammals described in 1959
EDGE species
Endemic fauna of Hainan
Gymnures
Mammals of China
Taxonomy articles created by Polbot